Erik Thastum (born 17 February 1926) was a Danish boxer. He competed in the men's bantamweight event at the 1948 Summer Olympics.

References

External links
 

1926 births
Possibly living people
Danish male boxers
Olympic boxers of Denmark
Boxers at the 1948 Summer Olympics
Sportspeople from Copenhagen
Bantamweight boxers